Kennedy Galleries is one of the oldest art galleries in the United States. It was founded by Hermann Wunderlich in 1874 under the name of Hermann Wunderlich & Co. When Wunderlich died in 1892, Edward G. Kennedy took over the gallery, whose name was changed in 1912 to Kennedy & Co. Kennedy retired in 1916, whereupon Herman Wunderlich became the gallery's senior partner until his death in 1951. The galleries changed their name to Kennedy Galleries in 1952.
The gallery has long specialized in representational art.

During the 1950s the Society of American Graphic Artists held their annual exhibitions at the Kennedy Galleries.

In 1976 the gallery held an exhibit of Alaskan masters.  R. T. Wallen was one of only two living artists represented at that exhibit.

In 2005, the gallery closed its gallery space but continued to operate as a private dealership.

Martha J. Fleischman is president of the Kennedy Galleries.

References

External links
Kennedy Galleries - official site

American art dealers
1874 establishments in New York (state)